Denmark competed at the 1968 Summer Olympics in Mexico City, Mexico. 64 competitors, 60 men and 4 women, took part in 53 events in 11 sports.

Medalists

Gold
 Gunnar Asmussen, Per Lyngemark, Reno Olsen and Mogens Jensen — Cycling, Men's team pursuit

Silver
 Niels Fredborg — Cycling, Men's 1000 metre time trial
 Mogens Jensen — Cycling, Men's individual pursuit
 Leif Mortensen — Cycling, Men's individual road race
 Aage Birch, Poul Richard Høj Jensen and Niels Markussen — Sailing, Men's Dragon class

Bronze
 Erik Hansen — Canoeing, Men's K-1 1000 metres
 Peter Christiansen and Ib Ivan Larsen — Rowing, Men's coxless pair
 Harry Jørgensen, Jørn Krab and Preben Krab — Rowing, Men's coxed pair

Athletics

Boxing

Canoeing

Cycling

Thirteen cyclists represented Denmark in 1968.

Individual road race
 Leif Mortensen
 Ole Højlund Pedersen
 Jørgen Emil Hansen
 Svend Erik Bjerg

Team time trial
 Verner Blaudzun
 Jørgen Emil Hansen
 Ole Højlund Pedersen
 Leif Mortensen

Sprint
 Niels Fredborg
 Peder Pedersen

1000m time trial
 Niels Fredborg

Tandem
 Per Sarto Jørgensen
 Jørgen Jensen

Individual pursuit
 Mogens Frey Jensen

Team pursuit
 Gunnar Asmussen
 Reno Olsen
 Mogens Frey Jensen
 Per Lyngemark
 Peder Pedersen

Gymnastics

Modern pentathlon

One male pentathlete represented Denmark in 1968.

Men's Individual Competition:
 Jørn Steffensen – 4545 points (13th place)

Rowing

Sailing

Open

Shooting

Six shooters, all men, represented Denmark in 1968.

50 m pistol
 Jørgen Gabrielsen
 Niels Dahl

50 m rifle, three positions
 Ole Hviid Jensen
 Per Weichel

50 m rifle, prone
 Ole Hviid Jensen
 Per Weichel

Skeet
 Ernst Pedersen
 Benny Jensen

Swimming

Wrestling

References

Nations at the 1968 Summer Olympics
1968
Summer Olympics